The white bikini worn by Ursula Andress as Honey Ryder in the 1962 James Bond film, Dr. No.,
is cited as the most famous bikini of all time and an iconic moment in cinematic and fashion history.

Andress's white bikini is regarded as monumental in the history of the bikini, and sales of the two-piece bikini rocketed after the appearance of Andress in Dr. No. The lower part of the bikini features a wide white British Army belt with brass buckles and fittings, and a scabbard on the left side to hold a large knife.

History 
The first bikini had been worn at a Paris fashion show in 1946, but in the 1950s the bikini was still seen as something of a taboo. Andress' bikini arrived at a key moment in the history of women's fashion, coming at the "birth of the sexual revolution": the 1960s.

In the corresponding scene of the original novel, the character Honeychile Rider wears only a leather belt with a scabbard, and no bikini.

The bikini was put up for sale in 2001 by Andress herself, who claimed she found it in an attic. The suit fetched £41,125. The second time it was auctioned was in November 2020. While no sale price was given, the piece was expected to fetch about £500,000.

Design 
Andress designed the bikini along with Dr. Nos costume designer Tessa Prendergast, whom she first met while living in Rome. Andress reported that when she arrived in Jamaica for filming, no costumes were ready. She worked with director Terence Young and the costume designer to create something that fit her 5′6″, 36-24-36 frame. It was made from ivory cotton and was the only one made and worn by her. It is a white belted bikini.

Reception 
The Dr. No bikini is cited as the best known bikini of all time and an iconic moment in cinematic and fashion history. The moment in which Andress emerges from the sea in the white bikini has been cited amongst the greatest moments in film and one of its most erotic; in a 2003 UK Survey by Channel 4, it was voted number one in "the 100 Greatest Sexy Moments" of cinema. The scene has been widely emulated and parodied on screen since. The white bikini is regarded as perhaps the most important in the history of the bikini and sales of the two-piece bikini rocketed after the appearance of Andress in Dr. No. In a survey of 1000 women to celebrate the 60th anniversary of the bikini, Ursula Andress in her white bikini was voted "The Ultimate Bikini Goddess". Andress said that she owed her career to that white bikini, remarking, "This bikini made me into a success. As a result of starring in Dr. No as the first Bond girl, I was given the freedom to take my pick of future roles and to become financially independent."

Homage 
The bikini and scene in Dr. No of Andress emerging from the water was emulated by Heather Graham in a scene from Austin Powers: The Spy Who Shagged Me. It has also been emulated by Halle Berry, who wore an orange bikini with a toolbelt in the 2002 James Bond film Die Another Day.

When Daniel Craig took over the role of James Bond in the 2006 film Casino Royale, he appeared in a similar scene, emerging from the ocean wearing only a pale blue pair of swim trunks. This thirteen-second shot, focused on Bond's body rather than that of a Bond Girl, was widely interpreted as a callback to Andress in Dr. No and featured heavily in the film's promotion, although Craig claims the resemblance did not occur to him until it was filmed.

In the episode "Bond", from the BBC Radio detective drama Trueman and Riley, the bikini is the prize possession of a collector and dealer in James Bond memorabilia at a hotel hosting a Bond convention, where another valuable item, the wedding ring from the film On Her Majesty's Secret Service, has apparently been stolen.

See also 
 Bikini in popular culture
 Fur bikini of Raquel Welch

References 

1960s fashion
1962 clothing
Dr. No (film)
Individual bikinis
Fictional garments